Shorea faguetiana is a species of plant in the family Dipterocarpaceae. Along with other species in the genus Shorea, it is also known as the Yellow Meranti. It is native to Borneo, the Malay Peninsula, and Thailand.

Height

The tallest specimen, named “Menara”, was measured on January 6, 2019.  The tree's height was measured from the top of the crown to the lowest part of the buttress. The average distance between the lowest and highest part of the trunk is 97.58 m. A team from Oxford University, University College London, and Danum Valley Conservation Area scanned the tree to create a 3D model, 

This tree was discovered on May 28, 2018.

See also
The world's tallest tree species

References

faguetiana
Trees of Borneo
Trees of Peninsular Malaysia
Trees of Thailand
Taxonomy articles created by Polbot